Hartwell Farm was a restaurant in Lincoln, Massachusetts, United States. Established in 1925 by Marion A. Fitch, a Boston schoolteacher, and Jane Hamilton Poor, an artchitect, it occupied the 1733-built Samuel Hartwell House, on Virginia Road in today's Minute Man National Historical Park, until 1968. The building was destroyed by fire in 1973, and all that remains is its central chimney stack.

The restaurant's name preserved that of the property owned by Samuel Hartwell (1742–1829).

Recipes from the restaurant have been published in several books, including Adventures in Good Eating (1940s and 1950s), Mrs. Appleyard's Kitchen (1974), The Great American Cookbook (2011) and Adventures in Good Cooking (2014). It was described as serving "country fare."

The dining table of the restaurant, which served luncheon and dinner, was placed in a "moon" arrangement so as not to have the guests sitting uncomfortably close to the fireplace.

Poor died of edema in October 1961.

In 1974, Fitch published Hartwell Farm – A Way of Life, a book which documented the running of the property, including the introduction of running water.

Dining table

Building remains

References 

Restaurants in Massachusetts
Restaurants established in 1926
1926 establishments in Massachusetts
Lincoln, Massachusetts